Postoperative fever refers to an elevated body temperature (≥ 38.5 °C) occurring after a recent surgical procedure. Diagnosing the cause of postoperative fever can sometimes be challenging; while fever in this context may be benign, self-limited, or unrelated to the surgical procedure, it can also be indicative of a surgical complication, such as infection.

Causes
The most common causes of postoperative fever are often summarized for medical students by a mnemonic beginning with the letter W. The classic list consists of five W's – Wind, Water, Wound, Walking, and Wonder Drugs, but two other causes should also be considered – Wing/Waterway and (W)abscess. There is a characteristic timeframe after surgery when many of these complications tend to develop (postoperative days or POD).

Other important causes of early post-operative fever that are omitted from this list include malignant hyperthermia, a potentially life-threatening but treatable response to inhalational anesthetic and paralytic agents.

Early postoperative fever (i.e., within the first 48 hours post-operatively) has often been ascribed to atelectasis, or splinting, but it is most likely part of a natural and non-infectious inflammatory response (with sympathetic nervous system involvement) to the tissue injury sustained during surgery; it generally requires no medical intervention except antipyretics and extra fluid intake.

Workup
The diagnostic workup of post-operative fever is guided by the potential etiologies on the differential diagnosis. The patient's surgical and post-operative course should be reviewed in detail, noting whether the patient has been regularly using an incentive spirometer or not, whether a Foley catheter was/is in place, what medications s/he has received, etc. The patient should be asked if s/he is having any pain (and where?) or other symptoms such as coughing or dysuria, which may help to localize the source of the fever. A thorough physical exam should be conducted, auscultating the lungs, noting erythema or drainage from the surgical incision(s), evaluating IV sites, noting lower extremity edema, etc.

Laboratory testing and imaging is generally deferred for evaluation of fever that occurs within the first 48 hours post-operatively, unless prompted by specific findings in the history and physical exam. Beyond 48 hours, testing routinely includes urine and blood cultures as well as a chest X-ray.

Popular culture
In the pilot episode of the medical drama Grey's Anatomy, Meredith Grey refers to this mnemonic: "Wind, water, wound, walking, wonder drugs. The 5 Ws. Most of the time it’s wind; splinting or pneumonia. Pneumonia is easy to assume. Especially if you're too busy to do the tests."

See also 
 Patient safety
 Perioperative mortality

References

Surgery
Fever
Medical mnemonics